Ischnomelissa rasmusseni is a Neotropic bee in the family Halictidae.

References

Halictidae
Insects described in 2002
Taxa named by Michael S. Engel